Chlidoniopsidae is a family of bryozoans belonging to the order Cheilostomatida.

Genera:
 Celiopsis Zágoršek, Gordon & Vávra, 2015

References

Cheilostomatida